Napoleon Yaovi Richard Ashley-Lassen (born 29 March 1934) was a Chief of the Defence Staff of the Ghana Armed Forces. He was also twice Chief of Air Staff of the Ghana Air Force. He was also a member of the National Redemption Council (NRC), formed after the overthrow of the Busia government in 1972.

Career 
Ashley-Lassen was born in Port Harcourt, Nigeria in 1934. He was commissioned into the Ghana Army. At one stage, he served as a pilot ferrying Ghanaian troops to and from the Democratic Republic of Congo during the United Nations peace keeping exercise there. He was appointed Chief of Air Staff in 1968 when the National Liberation Council military government was in power. He served a second brief term between December 1971 and January 1972. Following the overthrow of the Busia government on 13 January 1972, he was appointed as the Chief of the Defence Staff, a position he held until December 1974.

Politics 
Following the 13 January 1972 coup d'état led by then Colonel Acheampong, he was appointed a member of the ruling National Redemption Council military government.

References 

Living people
Ghanaian soldiers
Ghana Air Force air marshals
People of the Congo Crisis
1934 births
People from Port Harcourt
National Defence College, India alumni